Ivy Molly Bolton (1897 – 2 January 1991) was a British politician.

Bolton joined the Fabian Society in 1916, and became private secretary to Beatrice and Sydney Webb.  She then became secretary of the Fabian Local Government and Research Bureau, and assistant editor of Local Government News, and served on the society's executive committee.

At the London County Council election, 1934, Bolton was elected as a Labour Party candidate in Hackney North.  She held the seat and its successor, Stoke Newington and Hackney North, until 1952.  That year, she became an alderman, and she was chair of the council in 1953/54.  When the council was dissolved, in 1965, she retired.

References

1897 births
1991 deaths
Members of the Fabian Society
Members of London County Council
Women councillors in England